Brandywine High School is a public secondary school located near Talleys Corner in unincorporated New Castle County, Delaware, with a Wilmington postal address. Although the school is not within the Wilmington city limits, it does serve some parts of the city north of the Brandywine River. It is a part of the Brandywine School District.

There were 940 students enrolled in the fall for the 2020–2021 school year. Rebecca Reggio is the current principal of Brandywine High School.

Athletics 
Brandywine is a member of the Delaware Interscholastic Athletic Association (DIAA). The Bulldogs compete in Flight B of the Blue Hen Conference with a full slate of teams in all three sports seasons:
 
Brandywine's sports include: cross country, field hockey, football, soccer, volleyball, cheerleading, basketball, swimming, wrestling, cheerleading, indoor track, baseball, softball, golf, lacrosse, tennis, and track and field.

Recognitions 
In 2021, U.S. News & World Report ranked Brandywine #5,392 out of almost 24,000 public schools across the United States and Niche ranked it in the top 50% best public schools for athletes in New Castle County.

The school was recognized by the Blue Ribbon Schools Program for the 1982–1983 school year.

Appearances in media
First lady Jill Biden spoke from the classroom in which she formerly taught at the school (room 232) for her remote address to the 2020 Democratic National Convention. Biden's husband Joe Biden was in the high school at the moment he formally was nominated for president during the convention.

Notable alumni 

Dexter Boney, former basketball player in the National Basketball Association and Continental Basketball Association
Dennis Brockenborough, trumpet player for the Mighty Mighty Bosstones from 1990 to 2000
John Gallagher Jr., Tony Award-winning actor best known for Spring Awakening
Joan Goodfellow, film, television, and stage actress; mezzo-soprano
Sean Patrick Thomas, actor
George Thorogood, musician known for hits such as "Bad to the Bone"
Christopher Voigt, synthetic biology pioneer and MIT professor
Ben Warheit, Emmy-nominated actor, comedian, and writer, Late Night with Seth Meyers

Notable faculty
Jill Biden, Second lady of the United States 2009–2017, first lady of the United States (FLOTUS) 2021–present

References

External links
 Brandywine High School website
 Video clips of Brandywine Music and Drama performances

High schools in New Castle County, Delaware
Public high schools in Delaware
Educational institutions established in 1958
1958 establishments in Delaware